The 1933 San Diego State Aztecs football team represented San Diego State Teachers College during the 1933 NCAA football season.

San Diego State competed in the Southern California Intercollegiate Athletic Conference (SCIAC). The 1933 San Diego State team was led by head coach Walter Herreid in his fourth season with the Aztecs. They played home games at Navy "Sports" Field. The Aztecs finished the season with four wins, four losses and one tie (4–4–1, 2–2–1 SCIAC). Overall, the team was outscored by its opponents 59–72 points for the season. This low scoring season included five shut outs of their opponents and being shut out five times.

Schedule

Notes

References

San Diego State
San Diego State Aztecs football seasons
San Diego State Aztecs football